Tang Jingmei (born May 24, 1987), is a Chinese actress. She gained popularity through her various supporting roles.

Filmography

Film

Television series

Awards and nominations

References

1987 births
Living people
Chinese film actresses
Chinese television actresses
Actresses from Jiangxi
Beijing Film Academy alumni
21st-century Chinese actresses